This is a list of members of the Victorian Legislative Assembly as elected at the 15 November 1917 election and subsequent by-elections up to the election of 6 August 1920:

 Elmslie died 11 May 1918; replaced by Joseph Hannan in June 1918; Hannan resigned in October 1919 to (unsuccessfully) contest the Federal seat of Fawkner; replaced by Arthur Wallace in November 1919.
 John Hall was replaced by John Pennington in February 1918 after Pennington was declared elected by the Elections and Qualification Committee.
 Stewart resigned in October 1919; replaced by Francis Old in November 1919.

Sources
 Re-member (a database of all Victorian MPs since 1851). Parliament of Victoria.

Members of the Parliament of Victoria by term
20th-century Australian politicians